The Naval War College (NWC) is a premier training institution of the Indian Navy, located in Goa. The college aims at developing leadership qualities of the officers of the Indian Armed Forces at the strategic and operational level. It is one of the three War Colleges of the Indian Armed Forces, Army War College, Mhow and College of Air Warfare, being the other two. The NWC operates under the Southern Naval Command, which is the training command of the Indian Navy.

History
The Naval War College was established on 17 September 1988 as the College of Naval Warfare (CNW) at Karanja in Mumbai. The first Naval Higher Command Course (NHCC) began in 1988, while the first Technical Management Course (TMC) commenced in 1994. By 2005, the Naval academy was to move from Goa to its new campus in Ezhimala. It was decided that CNW would move into the Naval Academy campus. On 18 August 2010, the CNW was renamed Naval War College and finally shifted to Goa in September 2011.

Courses
The NWC conducts the following courses:

Naval Higher Command Course (NHCC)
The NHCC is the flagship course of NWC which runs for around 37 weeks. The course is attended by Indian Armed Forces Officers of the rank of Captain, Colonel and Group Captain.

Regional Maritime Security Course (RMSC)
The RMSC is conducted over 8 weeks. The course is aimed at Officers of the rank of Colonel, Captain and Group Captain from the maritime security forces of Friendly Foreign Countries, like Bangladesh, Sri Lanka, Myanmar, Maldives, Oman, etc.

Technical Management Course (TMC)
The TMC is a 22-week course conducted jointly by the NWC and Jamnalal Bajaj Institute of Management Studies, Mumbai. The course is attended by Naval officers of the rank of Commander.

Accreditations and Degrees
The participants of the NHCC receive a Master of Philosophy (M.Phil) degree from the University of Mumbai, while the participants of the TMC receive the Post Graduate Diploma in Management (PGDM) from Jamnalal Bajaj Institute of Management Studies.

Other Events & Programmes
The NWC conducts annually, the Goa Maritime Conclave and Goa Maritime Symposium. These events are organised as a regional cooperation and diplomatic forum on maritime subjects. The NWC also has a faculty exchange programme with the Naval War College, United States, Naval War College, Tokyo and the Naval War College in Myanmar. The Commanders' Conclave is held at the NWC annually and is attended by the Chief of the Naval Staff and the Flag Officers Commanding-in-Chief Western Naval Command, Eastern Naval Command, Southern Naval Command and the Andaman and Nicobar Command.

Commandants
The College of Naval Warfare was headed by a Director. The appointment was filled by a Commodore. The appointment was upgraded to two-star rank and re-designated Commandant Naval War College. Rear Admiral R. Hari Kumar,  was appointed the first Commandant on 30 January 2012.

The Commandant leads the Senior Directing Staff of the College, who function as the faculty and is assisted by the Deputy Commandant, held by a Commodore.

See also
 Army War College, Mhow
 College of Air Warfare
 Indian National Defence University
 Military Academies in India

References

Military academies of India
Military education and training in India
1988 establishments in Goa
Educational institutions established in 1988
War colleges